The 2008/09 NTFL season was the 88th season of the Northern Territory Football League (NTFL).

St Marys have won there 27th premiership title while defeating Wanderers Eagles in the grand final by 64 points.

Grand Final

References

Northern Territory Football League seasons
NTFL